"You Don't Own Me" is a song by indie pop band Pale Waves.

Music and lyrics
"You Don't Own Me" is a pop-punk song that was written by Pale Waves frontwoman Heather Baron-Gracie, and the singer-songwriter Sam de Jong; it is played in the key of C# minor and at 170 beats per minute. Described by Stitched Sound as a "empowering, guitar-heavy release of frustration", "You Don't Own Me" opens with a "gritty chugging guitar" riff that plays over the song's verses. The song then "transition[s] into a punk-pop [chorus] melody, which Avril Lavigne would be proud of".

Lyrically, "You Don't Own Me" is a repudiation of sexism and gender norms. In an interview with NME, Baron-Gracie explained that the track is "about what it’s like to be a woman in this world ... [It discusses] how society depicts, judges and criticises women on a daily basis. ... I also wanted to say a fuck you to everyone that plays by these fake delusional rules that women and gender need to fit inside a specific box." Many of the song's lyrics were inspired by instances of "sexist" and "inappropriate" behaviour directed at Baron-Gracie by men. The feminist ethos of the song is "unapologetic" and "angry" because, as Baron-Gracie put it, "we [i.e., women] are angry; we're sick of it!" Due to its message, Baron-Gracie has cited the track as "the most important on" Who Am I?

Music video

The music video for "You Don't Own Me" was co-directed by Heather Baron-Gracie and her partner, Kelsi Luck. Released on 1 March, the video is "a love letter to early noughties emo and pop-punk"; the website Nü Sounds wrote that the visuals of "You Don't Own Me" are a "portal to early 2000s grunge; red hair, graffiti, all the works." The site also likened Baron-Gracie's dress to those worn by Melanie Martinez and called the overall production "a throwback of a lifetime".

Release and reception
"You Don't Own Me" was released as the fourth single from Who Am I?, and it debuted on 13 January 2021.

Personnel
Credits adapted from the liner notes of Who Am I?

Pale Waves
 Heather Baron-Gracie – vocals, guitar
 Ciara Doran – drums, synths, programming
 Hugo Silvani – guitar
 Charlie Wood – bass guitar

Technical
 Rich Costey – production
 Koby Berman – additional production
 Ciara Doran – additional production

Release history

References

2021 songs
British pop punk songs
Dirty Hit singles
Pale Waves songs
Songs with feminist themes
Songs written by Sam de Jong
Songs written by Heather Baron-Gracie
Song recordings produced by Sam de Jong